David Allan Hamer (26 January 1938 – 15 May 1999) was a New Zealand historian.

Hamer was born in Remuera, Auckland and educated at the University of Auckland, where he was awarded a BA and MA in history with first class honours. In 1965 he was awarded a DPhil from Oxford University. He then went on to teach at Lancaster University, the University of Auckland and Victoria University of Wellington. He was chairman of the history department at Victoria from 1984 until 1986 and again in 1997. He also served as dean of arts from 1988 until 1991 and assistant vice chancellor for academic affairs from 1991 until 1994.

He was elected to a Fellowship of the Royal Historical Society. From 1993 until 1997 he was on the board of directors of the Urban History Association.

He died of a heart attack in 1999, age 61.

Works
John Morley: Liberal Intellectual in Politics (Oxford: Clarendon Press, 1968, 2019). , 
‘The Irish Question and Liberal Politics, 1886–1894’, The Historical Journal, Vol. 12, No. 3 (1969), pp. 511–532.
Liberal Politics in the Age of Gladstone and Rosebery: A Study in Leadership and Policy (Oxford: Clarendon Press, 1972, 2019). , 
Politics of Electoral Pressure: A Study in the History of Victorian Reform Agitation (Hassocks: Harvester Press, 1977). 
‘Gladstone: The Making of a Political Myth’, Victorian Studies, Vol. 22, No. 1 (Autumn, 1978), pp. 29–50.
‘Time, Space, and the Western Town’, AJAS, Vol. 1, No. 2 (July 1981), pp. 15–24.
(with Max Kelly), ‘Urban history in Australasia’, Urban History Yearbook, Vol. [11] (1984), pp. 61–80.
The New Zealand Liberals: The Years of Power, 1891–1912 (Auckland: Auckland University Press, 1988). 
History in Urban Places: The Historic Districts of the United States (Ohio State University Press, 1998).

Notes

1938 births
1999 deaths
Writers from Auckland
University of Auckland alumni
20th-century New Zealand historians
Fellows of the Royal Historical Society